The year 1705 in music involved some significant events.

Events
Johann Sebastian Bach travels to Lübeck to hear Dieterich Buxtehude perform.
Alessandro Scarlatti notes that he has written 88 operas in the past 23 years.
William Croft marries Mary George.
Jean-Féry Rebel joins Les Vingt-quatre Violons du Roi.
The earliest fandango melody is recorded in the anonymous Libro de diferentes cifras de guitarra.

Classical music
Johann Michael Bach – Gelobet seist du, Jesu Christ (formerly attributed to JS Bach, BWV 723)
Johann Sebastian Bach  
Prelude and Fugue in E minor, BWV 533
Prelude and Fugue in G minor, BWV 535a
Prelude and Fugue in C minor, BWV 549
Prelude in G major, BWV 568
Prelude in A minor, BWV 569
Fantasia in C major, BWV 570
Wie schön leuchtet der Morgenstern, BWV 739
Suite in A minor, BWV 818
Overture in F major, BWV 820
Suite in G minor, BWV 822
Sonata in A minor, BWV 965
Sonata in C major, BWV 966
Sonata in A minor, BWV 967
Friedrich Nicolaus Brauns – St Mark Passion (formerly attributed to Reinhard Keiser)
Sébastien de Brossard – Samson trahi par Dalila
Dietrich Buxtehude – Prelude in G minor, BuxWV 150
Antonio Caldara – Kyrie in A minor
François Campion – Nouvelles découvertes Sur la Guitarre
François Couperin 
Mottets à voix seule, deux et trois parties et symphonies
7 Versets du motet composé de l'ordre du roy, 1705
Michel Richard Delalande – Mottets de Monsieur de La Lande
Jean Gilles – Requiem
George Frideric Handel  
Chaconne in G major, HWV 442
Air in A major, HWV 468
Gavotte in G major, HWV 491
Johann Kuhnau – Gott sei mir gnädig
Gaspard Le Roux – Pièces de clavessin
Antonio Lotti – Duetti, terzetti, e madrigali a più voci
Johann Pachelbel – Toccata in C major, P.455-6
Bernardo Pascoli – Moteti sagri a voce sola..., Op. 1
John Christopher Pepusch – 6 Record Sonatas, Op.1
Alessandro Scarlatti – Solitudini amene, bersaglio d'empia sorte, H.664
Georg Philipp Telemann – Ich hebe meine Augen auf zu den Bergen, TWV 7:17
Antonio Vivaldi – 12 Trio Sonatas, Op.1

Opera
The following operas were composed:
Tomaso Albinoni – L'Eraclea
Antonio Caldara – L'Arminia
Thomas Clayton, Nicola Haym, & Charles Dieupart – Arsinoe, Queen of Cyprus, produced at the Drury Lane Theatre in London
Francesco Gasparini 
Ambleto
Antioco
George Frideric Handel – Almira, premièred in Hamburg
Reinhard Keiser – Octavia (or Die römische Unruhe, oder Die edelmühtige Octavia)
Alessandro Scarlatti  
Alle Troiane antenne, H.30
Il Sedecia, re di Gerusalemme

Theoretical Writings 

 Jacques Boyvin – Traité abrégé de l’Accompagnement
 Johann Peter Sperling – Principia Musicæ

Births 
:De: Johann Elias Bach January 24 – Farinelli, celebrated castrato (died 1782)
February 20 – Nicolas Chédeville, composer, musette player and maker (died 1782)
September 19 – Marguerite-Antoinette Couperin, French harpsichordist (died 1778)
September 28 – Johann Peter Kellner, organist and composer (died 1772)
November 5 – Louis-Gabriel Guillemain, composer and violinist (died 1770)
November 29 – Michael Christian Festing, violinist and composer (died 1752)
date unknown
Louis Archimbaud, organist and composer (died 1789)
Nicola Sabatino, composer (died 1796)
probable – Joseph-Nicolas-Pancrace Royer, composer and harpsichordist (died 1755)

Deaths 
February – Pierre Beauchamp, dancer, choreographer and composer (born 1631)
February 5 – Jean Gilles, composer (born 1668)
June 13 – Nicholas Staggins, composer, Master of the King's Musick
April 17 – Johann Paul von Westhoff, violinist and composer (born 1656)
December 1 – Jeremiah Clarke, composer (born c. 1674)
probable – Giovanni Battista Rogeri, luthier (born c. 1650)

References

 
18th century in music
Music by year